Bowness was a station which served Bowness-on-Solway, a village in Cumbria on the English side of the Solway Firth. The station opened on 8 August 1870 by the Caledonian Railway on a line constructed from the Caledonian Railway Main Line at Kirtlebridge across the Glasgow South Western Line, then forming the Solway Junction Railway over the Solway Viaduct to Brayton.  The line opened in 1869 and freight had run since 13 September 1869.

History 
Bowness was opened by the Solway Junction Railway, then part of the Caledonian Railway  The passenger service was never well patronised and reduced to being just one carriage at the front of an occasional goods train and in September 1917 this was suspended, but was reinstated in 1920. Passenger services were finally withdrawn in 1921 and the line south of Annan over the Solway Viaduct was closed completely.

The station was only built as an afterthought following a petition from local people. It had two platforms, a signal box, cattle pens and an overbridge at the northern end. Old photographs show a carriage body on one platform as a shelter, etc.  In 1910 a watertank was located next to the overbridge and the platform beside the signal box had no buildings, not even a passenger shelter. In 1915 the signalbox was open from 4 am to 8:30 pm.

Disused, the station became the property of the London, Midland and Scottish Railway in 1923 until sold together with the viaduct.

The Solway railway viaduct
Beyond Bowness station the railway ran along an embankment and then crossed the estuary of the Solway upon an iron girder viaduct, one mile 176 yards in length. The local people's frustration at the delay in reopening the Solway Viaduct after it was damaged in 1881 is recorded in the newspapers of the day.

The site today 
The station house is now a private dwelling.

References 
Notes

Sources
 
 
 
 

Further reading
 
 
 Railways of the Solway Plain

External links
 RAILSCOT on Solway Junction Railway

Disused railway stations in Cumbria
Former Caledonian Railway stations
Railway stations in Great Britain opened in 1870
Railway stations in Great Britain closed in 1917
Railway stations in Great Britain opened in 1920
Railway stations in Great Britain closed in 1921